A silverback is an adult male gorilla.

Silverback may also refer to:

Sports
 Atlanta Silverbacks, an American professional soccer team
 Cincinnati Silverbacks, an indoor soccer club
 Miami Valley/Dayton Silverbacks, a former professional indoor football team
 Quad Cities Silverbacks, an International Fight League team
 Salmon Arm Silverbacks, a Tier II Junior "A" ice hockey team

Athletes nicknamed "silverback"
 Seth Petruzelli, mixed martial arts fighter
 Trent Williams, an offensive tackle for the San Francisco 49ers
 Tanga Loa, an American professional wrestler
 Jason Dunstall, former Australian Rules full-forward for the Hawthorn Hawks

Other
 Luina, a genus of plants common called silverback
 Silverback Cargo Freighters, a cargo airline
 Silverback Gorilla, an album by rapper Sheek Louch
 Silverback Games, a Canadian video game developer
 iPhone (1st generation), a mobile phone nicknamed "silverback" for its aluminium back plate